Baldwin Bluff is a rock bluff along the southwest side of Ironside Glacier, about  southwest of the summit of Mount Whewell, in the Admiralty Mountains, Victoria Land, Antarctica. The geographical feature was first mapped by the United States Geological Survey from surveys and from U.S. Navy air photos, 1960–64, and was named by the Advisory Committee on Antarctic Names for Howard A. Baldwin, a biologist at McMurdo Station, 1966–67. The bluff lies on the Pennell Coast, a portion of Antarctica lying between Cape Williams and Cape Adare.

References 

Cliffs of Victoria Land
Pennell Coast